Kindling is the first novel in the Flame of Evil series written by Mick Farren, featuring The Four: a mythical group of young adults with supernatural powers. Its first edition was published in August 2004, and its first mass-market edition in February 2004.

Plot Overview 

A ravening horde of barbarians from the East, the Mosul Empire, in unholy alliance with the Teutons and the Mameluke warlords led by the brutal theocracy of the Zhaithan, has subjugated the Land of the Franks and the Hispanic Peninsula. Setting their sights on the New World, they have already conquered the Republic of Greater Carolina and the Virginia Freestate. Only the Kingdom of Albany still stands, aided by the Norse Alliance of Britain and Scandinavia.

Four youngsters from very different backgrounds are brought together to form The Four - a supernatural entity that becomes the last-ditch hope of the Free World.

External links 
 Funtopia

2000 novels
Tor Books books